Shritama Mukherjee (born 3 November 1993) is an Indian television actress. She is best known for her portrayal of Rajkumari Jainandini in the show Dekha Ek Khwaab and Vinita 'Vinnie' Maheshwari. Mukherjee played the role of Mahi in Tashan-e-Ishq. Currently she is the Founder, Editor in Chief And Creative Director of The Green Maven.

Early life and career
Shritama is from a Bengali family she was born and brought up in Kota in Rajasthan. She dropped out of school and moved to Mumbai to pursue a career in acting.

Shritama made her debut with Sony TV's serial Dekha Ek Khwaab in 2011, where she played the role of Rajkumari Jainandini.

She played the role of  Vinnie (Vinita) in Best Friends Forever? telecast on Channel V.

In May 2015 she played the role of Vedika in Do Dil Ek Jaan telecast on Life OK. She was also seen on Channel V show Yeh Jawani Ta Ra Ri Ri and in Gustakh Dil on Life OK.

She made her film debut with Soombe, a Tulu film directed by Saikrishna Kudla released on 13 March 2015 all around Tulunadu.

In 2016 she was cast in the role of Mahi in Tashan-e-Ishq.

Television

References

1993 births
Living people
Indian television actresses
21st-century Indian actresses
Actresses from Rajasthan
People from Kota, Rajasthan